Lynwood High School is one of three high schools in Lynwood, California, USA. It is a part of the Lynwood Unified School District.

History 
Lynwood High School was built on Bullis Road from 1940-1998 (currently used as a middle school, Lynwood Middle School.) In 1998, Lynwood High School was relocated on Imperial Highway, formerly the site of Lynwood Adventist Academy.

Lynwood High School has three thousand students from grades 9-12. The school provides academic programs like AVID, AP, and Honors. Electives offered are 3D Art, culinary arts, drama,  computer design/graphics/science, home economics, wood shop, film, medical terminology,  engineering, auto shop, band, ASB, ceramics and photography.

Sports
Sports include boys football, boys basketball, girls basketball, baseball, softball, boys soccer, girls soccer, boys tennis, girls tennis, boys volleyball, girls volleyball, cheer, track & field, cross-country, and lacrosse. Lynwood High School plays in the San Gabriel Valley League against Warren, Downey, Dominguez, Paramount, and Gahr.

The school has been recognized for their "Lady Knights" girls basketball team. Every year the Lady Knights win championships in Southern California and tournaments around the nation. They have won over 30 SGVL championships, 10 CIF SS championships, and three CIF State Championships. In 2002, the "Lady Knights" won the National CIF Championship with a record of 33-0 in girls basketball and finished ranked Number 1 in the country. Now the girls basketball team is ranked in the top 50 in the USA and in the top 20 in California.

Marching Band History
Dr. Ronald Savitt began teaching during the later half of the 1970s. Dr. Savitt's predecessor was Robert "Bob" Smith, who taught at the Bullis Road school from at least the mid 1960s until his retirement and succession by Dr. Savitt.

The Savitt Era
The LHS band during Dr. Savitt's era, known by its full name as the Lynwood High School Royal Knights Marching Band or The Lynwood High School Royal Knights Regimental Brigade, performed over 25 parades a year. They would travel to Big Bear Mountain in the summer to perform at a parade, march in Los Angeles to help celebrate Chinese New Year, perform three parades in one day to help commemorate the 4th of July, and have performed in the Los Angeles County Fair. The band has gone out of state to perform in Las Vegas, Nevada.

The Jazz band took second place in a competition at the Monterey Jazz Festival and the marching band "Lynwood High School Royal Knights Regimental Brigade" have won first place and sweepstake awards. The marching band has performed at events that did not involve any marching, including the Los Angeles Raiders and Rams games, pre game for the Los Angeles Dodgers, the opening of the I-105/I-710 section of the freeway, Peter Pipers Pizza Bell, Superior Warehouse Lynwood and the opening of Firebaugh High School in Lynwood, CA. In 2006, Dr. Savitt decided to retire

Despite any setbacks currently involving the music program in Lynwood High School, it is perhaps the only group that can be said to have the most awards within the school. With trophies numbering well over 300, numerous certificates, donations and a formerly well-known reputation, it is hard for many to imagine this high school without an active marching band.

The Jackson Era
C.J Jackson directed the Lynwood Performing Arts for 6 years. He began in 2011 and ended his journey with the High school in 2017. Under his direction were the Lynwood High School Drill Team, Colorguard, Band, Jazz Ensemble, Afro Latin ensemble, and Percussion ensemble. Many of the performing arts groups competed across various states including, Nevada, Arizona and In San Francisco, California. The Color Guard, Drill Team and band performed yearly in the L.A County Fair Parade and the Chinese New Year parade. In December 2015 they were invited to perform in the Disneyland parade.

Notable alumni 

 Don Bandy - football player in the NFL, played for the Washington Redskins
 Gale Banks - hot rodder, drag racer, engineer and entrepreneur
 Tim Barela - creator of LGBT comic strip Leonard & Larry
 Jim Barr baseball player, San Francisco Giants
 Wayne Bergeron - professional studio musician and jazz trumpet player
 Bud Bulling - baseball player
 Don Carrithers baseball, San Francisco Giants, Montreal Expos, Minnesota Twins
 Jaime Fields - NFL linebacker
 John Fuller - baseball player, Atlanta Braves
 Juaquin Hawkins - basketball player
 Sek Henry -  professional basketball player, 2018 Israeli Basketball Premier League MVP
 Davon Jefferson - basketball player in the Israeli Basketball Premier League
 Mike Kekich - baseball player in MLB, played for Los Angeles Dodgers, New York Yankees, Cleveland Indians, Texas Rangers, and Seattle Mariners
 Suge Knight - co-founder of Death Row Records
Chuck Levy - football player in the NFL, played for the Arizona Cardinals and San Francisco 49ers
 Efren Navarro - baseball player, Los Angeles Angels of Anaheim
 Fernando Pedroza - former mayor of Lynwood
Patty Rodriguez - radio DJ, publishing company founder, “Selena” MAC campaign advocate
 Pete Rozelle Commissioner, National Football League
 Duke Snider hall-of-fame baseball player, Brooklyn/Los Angeles Dodgers
Ariana Stein - entrepreneur, author
 Michael Tidwell - President, The University of Texas at Tyler
 Deniece Williams - R & B singer
 Vesta Williams - R & B singer
 "Weird Al" Yankovic - entertainer, singer, and actor (valedictorian, Class of 1975)

Media Appearances
Film
 Dismissed (2017) used the Lynwood High School campus as the setting for the high school in the film.

References

External links

 Lynwood High School
 Lynwood Girls Basketball Rankings

High schools in Los Angeles County, California
Lynwood, California
Public high schools in California
1940 establishments in California